Harry James Verran (6 July 1930 – 18 October 2015) was a Canadian politician and member of the House of Commons of Canada for South West Nova from 1993 to 1997. By career, he was a businessman, photographer and sailor.

Early life
Verran was born in Placentia, Newfoundland to James Placidious Verran and Mary Josephine Byrne. In 1949, he joined the Royal Canadian Navy and served for twenty years. As a photographer, he served on HMCS Bonaventure and HMCS Magnificent.

Political career
Verran won the South West Nova electoral district for the Liberal party in the 1993 federal election during the Liberals large majority government. He was able to win the district as a Liberal in part due to his socially conservative views, including campaigning against same-sex marriage. In the 1997 federal election, he campaigned in the West Nova riding but was defeated by Progressive Conservative candidate Mark Muise.

Verran died on 18 October 2015.

Electoral record

References

External links
 

1930 births
2015 deaths
Liberal Party of Canada MPs
Members of the House of Commons of Canada from Nova Scotia
People from Placentia, Newfoundland and Labrador